Club Atlético Alvarado is an Argentine football club from the city of Mar del Plata, Buenos Aires Province. The team currently plays in the Primera B Nacional, the 2nd division of the Argentine football league system.

The club has played at the highest level of Argentine football on only one occasion, more specifically in the 1978 Campeonato Nacional, which coincided with the 50th anniversary of its foundation. Alvarado participated in Group D of that tournament, finishing 7th of 8 teams. The team's most notable results that year were two 1-1 draws with Quilmes, the 1978 Metropolitano champion, a 4-4 draw with Atlanta and a great 5-0 victory over San Lorenzo.

In May 1992 Alvarado reached the Torneo Argentino A finals, only to lose the chance of promotion to the Primera B Nacional to Arsenal de Sarandí. At the end of the 2008-09 season the club was relegated from Torneo Argentino B after losing its playoff games at the hands of Crucero del Norte. Alvarado returned to the Torneo Argentino A in June 2012, after defeating Deportivo Roca by penalties in the playoffs.

Current squad

Out on loan

References

External links
 

 
Alvarado
Football clubs in Mar del Plata
1928 establishments in Argentina